Siemens Venture (also branded as Amtrak Airo) is a type of locomotive-hauled passenger railroad car built by Siemens Mobility for the North American market. The cars are derived from the Siemens Viaggio Comfort cars used in Europe, with adaptations for North American operations. The cars entered service with Brightline in 2018 and have since been ordered by Amtrak for national and state-supported routes (including those in California, Illinois, Michigan, Missouri, Wisconsin, and Washington) and Canada's Via Rail and Ontario Northland.

History 
The Venture dates to 2014, when All Aboard Florida purchased five trainsets for its new Brightline service along with ten Siemens Charger SCB-40 diesel-electric locomotives. They were built at the Siemens factory in Florin, California starting in July 2015. The first trainset was completed in December 2016. Public operations began on January 13, 2018.In November 2017, a coalition of states with state-supported Amtrak routes ordered 137 Venture railcars through its contractor Sumitomo Corporation. The order included seven trainsets for California and 88 cars for Illinois, Michigan, and Missouri ("Amtrak Midwest") as married pairs and single coaches. The Ventures were the coalition's second passenger railcar order; the first order of Next Generation Bi-Level Passenger Rail Cars was cancelled after the prototype, built by Sumitomo's subcontractor, Nippon Sharyo, failed a buff strength test in August 2015. The first three Venture cars entered testing in February 2020. They were originally planned to enter revenue service in July 2020 but were delayed, not making their first run until February 1, 2022, on a Lincoln Service train.

On December 12, 2018, Canada's national passenger rail service operator, Via Rail, announced that it was purchasing 32 Venture trainsets to replace the entire fleet used on its Québec City–Windsor Corridor. The first trainset was delivered for testing in 2021. They are expected to enter service in 2022–2024.

In August 2019, the state of Wisconsin used a Federal Railroad Administration grant to purchase six Venture coaches and three cab cars. The six coaches will be added to the Amtrak Midwest pool while the three cab cars will be used exclusively for Hiawatha Service trains.

In April 2021, Amtrak announced that they will be ordering 83 trainsets to replace the aging Amfleet I fleet and Metroliner cab cars. The contract was signed in July 2021 and includes 20 years of after-delivery service and support.

Operators 
Most Siemens Venture cars (except those for Amtrak Midwest) are configured as semi-permanently coupled trainsets with open gangways between cars and standard couplers on the ends for connecting the trainset to locomotives or other railway equipment.

Amtrak Cascades 
Amtrak has ordered eight six-car Venture trainsets for the Cascades service. They are replacing the Talgo Series VI trainsets, which the NTSB recommended be replaced "as soon as possible" after the 2017 Washington train derailment. Until the Venture trainsets arrive, Amtrak has been using its Horizon fleet on the route.

Each trainset will consist of five coaches and one cab car. Trains will also have a café for food service along with coach and business class seating. They will be paired with one of WSDOT's Siemens Charger locomotives. The first trainset is scheduled be delivered in 2025 and enter revenue service in 2026 after final commissioning.

Amtrak Midwest 

Illinois, Michigan, Missouri, and Wisconsin have ordered 97 Venture cars for the Amtrak Midwest routes including Blue Water, Hiawatha Service, Illini/Saluki, Illinois Zephyr/Carl Sandburg, Lincoln Service, Missouri River Runner, Pere Marquette, and Wolverine. Of the 97 cars, 68 are built as married pairs (two cars semi-permanently coupled with open gangways) while the remaining 29 are single (unmarried) cars with traditional gangways. Half of the married pairs (17) have a café car and an economy coach, while the remaining 17 have a combination business class/economy class coach and an economy-only coach. The business class and café cars have two vestibules each, while the economy coaches have one. This arrangement—unique among Venture operators—allows trains to be sized to meet the travel demands of individual routes and allows business class seating and cafe cars to be added or removed. Among the 29 single cars are three cab cars with economy seating for exclusive use on Hiawatha Service trains.

Amtrak Northeast Corridor 
Amtrak has made a firm order for 75 trainsets, which it will brand as the Amtrak Airo, for intercity routes that operate over its Northeast Corridor.

The trainsets will be built in three configurations, tailored to the capacity and propulsion needs of the routes over which they will operate. All trainsets will include an ALC-42E Charger locomotive on one end of the consist and a cab control passenger car on the opposite end. Onboard, there will be a car with a food service area and a mix of Coach Class and Business Class seating.

There will be 26 six-car catenary-diesel dual-power trainsets that will include an Auxiliary Power Vehicle (APV). The APV will be the trailer car closest to the locomotive and will include a pantograph, an underfloor transformer to handle the Northeast Corridor's 25 kV, 12.5 kV and 12 kV AC catenary power, a four quadrant chopper, and two powered trucks. In electrified territory, the APV will draw power from overhead lines, through the transformer and fed to the four traction motors in the car, and via a DC link cable, to the four traction motors in the locomotive. These trainsets will be used on the Carolinian, Downeaster, Keystone Service, Palmetto, Pennsylvanian and Vermonter.

There will also be 24 eight-car catenary-diesel dual-power trainsets, similarly configured, for use on Northeast Regional trains including through trains to Virginia and Springfield, Massachusetts. Amtrak has options to purchase up to eight additional eight-car catenary-diesel dual-power trainsets.

Amtrak will also purchase 15 six-car battery-diesel hybrid trainsets, where the trailer car closest to the locomotive will have batteries to supply electricity to traction motors in the locomotive when operating around New York Penn Station, eliminating the need for third rail propulsion on the Adirondack, Empire Service, Ethan Allen Express, and Maple Leaf. Amtrak has options to purchase up to two additional six-car battery-diesel hybrid trainsets.

Amtrak San Joaquins 

The California Department of Transportation has ordered seven Venture trainsets for the San Joaquins service with seven cars each: four coaches, two coaches with vending machines, and one cab control passenger car. Two cars per trainset will have built-in wheelchair lifts for compatibility with the low platforms used in California. The cab car and two other cars per trainset will have one vestibule per car, while the remaining cars will have two vestibules each. The San Joaquins service does not offer business class seating.

Brightline 

Brightline has purchased 10 Venture trainsets consisting of four cars: three with economy seating (branded "Smart Service") and one with business class seating (branded "Premium Service", formerly "Select"). Each trainset has two Siemens Charger SCB-40 diesel-electric locomotives, one on each end. Each trainset has a capacity of 248 passengers. Premium Service coaches have fifty  seats in a 2×1 layout, while Smart Service coaches have sixty-six  seats in a 2×2 layout.

Brightline purchased five trainsets for its initial service between Miami, Fort Lauderdale and West Palm Beach. Five more trainsets were purchased ahead of the lines extension to Orlando and additional stations opening in Aventura and Boca Raton. Brightline has said that it plans to eventually expand the trainsets to seven cars.

Ontario Northland 
In December 2022, the Government of Ontario and Ontario Northland announced a  investment to reinstate the Northlander passenger service between Timmins and Toronto. The government announced that it had ordered three, three-car trainsets (two coaches and a cab car) with a food service area, which would be paired with a Charger locomotive.

Via Rail 
Via Rail Venture trainsets will have five cars each: two business class coaches, two economy class coaches, and one cab control car with economy seating. Each trainset will be paired with a Siemens Charger SCV-42 diesel-electric locomotive. All seats will be 19 inches wide, with a 2×1 layout in business class and 2×2 in economy class.

References

External links 

 Siemens Venture trainsets product website

Amtrak rolling stock
Brightline
Rail passenger cars of the United States